Lada Chernova (born 1 January 1970) is a Russian javelin thrower. Her personal best throw is 63.35 meters, achieved in August 2007 in Tula.

She finished seventh at the 2006 World Cup. She also competed at the 2006 European Athletics Championships and the 2007 World Championships without reaching the final.

Chernova was given a two-year ban from competition in 2008 after testing positive for the banned substance metenolone. After her return to competition, she failed a second drugs test - for bromantan in February 2012, and was handed a lifetime ban by the Russian Anti-Doping Agency RUSADA. Chernova successfully appealed the decision in a Russian court, but the ban was subsequently confirmed following a counter-appeal by the World Anti-Doping Agency to the Court of Arbitration for Sport.

International competitions

See also
List of doping cases in athletics

References

External links
 

1970 births
Living people
Russian female javelin throwers
World Athletics Championships athletes for Russia
Russian Athletics Championships winners
Doping cases in athletics
Russian sportspeople in doping cases
20th-century Russian women